Doğuş Balbay (born 21 January 1989) is a Turkish professional basketball player and the team captain for Anadolu Efes Istanbul of the Turkish Basketbol Süper Ligi (BSL) and the EuroLeague. He is 6 ft 1 in (1.85 m) tall and he plays at the point guard position.

Amateur career

Doğuş Balbay started playing basketball in the Turkish club Fenerbahçe. After two years in the Turkish Basketball League, he moved to Brewster Academy, Wolfeboro, New Hampshire, U.S. to study.

Balbay spent the last two years playing on the Under-18 Turkish national team, and he helped the squad place fourth at the 2006 European Championships. He also played two years on the Under-16 Turkish national team and led that squad to the 2005 FIBA Europe Under-16 Championship.

He led Brewster to a 29–6 record and a runner-up finish at the NEPSAC Class A Championship while averaging 13.5 points and 7.5 assists per game during his senior season under coach Jason Smith.

After Balbay signed a letter of intent with Texas, Longhorns' head coach Rick Barnes declared that "Dogus is an important pickup for our program, as he will provide us quality depth at the point guard position." Barnes also said that Dogus "has a clever international game and good athleticism. Dogus is a strong perimeter defender and a good play maker who has the ability to score in the lane."

At the midway mark of the 2009–10 season, ESPN analyst Jay Bilas named Balbay one of the two top perimeter defenders in college basketball that season, along with Chris Kramer of Purdue. Bilas said about Balbay,

Doğuş was not drafted in the 2011 NBA draft but was linked with various European teams, including his native Fenerbahçe. His strength, versality, defensive prowess and speed is said to resemble Fenerbahçe and national player Ömer Onan.

ESPN analyst Fran Fraschilla named Doğuş his favourite player in the 2011 Eurocamp.

Professional career
In July 2011, he signed a three-year contract with Anadolu Efes. He won the 2012 BSL All-Star Slam Dunk Contest, securing the win by jumping over Anadolu Efes teammate and 2010 BSL All-Star Slam Dunk Contest champion Sinan Güler on his way to the basket. In May 2014, he re-signed his contract with Anadolu Efes.

Personal life
He is the son of Mithat (father) and Şükran (mother) Balbay, and has one older sister, Derya. He was married 8 July 2017 to Erica Balbay.

See also
Texas Longhorns men's basketball

References

External links

Doğuş Balbay at eurobasket.com
Doğuş Balbay at euroleague.net
Doğuş Balbay at interbasket.net
Doğuş Balbay at tblstat.net

1989 births
Living people
2019 FIBA Basketball World Cup players
Anadolu Efes S.K. players
Brewster Academy alumni
Competitors at the 2013 Mediterranean Games
Fenerbahçe men's basketball players
Mediterranean Games gold medalists for Turkey
Mediterranean Games medalists in basketball
Point guards
Basketball players from Istanbul
Texas Longhorns men's basketball players
Turkish expatriate basketball people in the United States
Turkish men's basketball players